was a Japanese journalist and politician from the Social Democratic Party. He served as member of the House of Councillors from 1977 to 1989.

He also served as Mayor of Ikeda, Hokkaido from 1957 to 1976.  During his tenure as mayor, he was instrumental in forming a sister city relationship with the City of Penticton in British Columbia Canada.  This relationship is still active in 2017 and a delegation from Penticton recently travelled to Ikeda Japan to celebrate the fortieth anniversary.

References

1919 births
2014 deaths
People from Hokkaido
Meiji University alumni
Japanese journalists
Social Democratic Party (Japan) politicians
Members of the House of Councillors (Japan)
Mayors of places in Hokkaido